James Wen (Pha̍k-fa-sṳ: Vûn Sin-hò; born 22 February 1978) is a Taiwanese actor, former reporter and model. He is known for his supporting performance in Taiwanese drama My Queen, for which he received one of his four Golden Bell Awards nominations. According to Yahoo! Search, Wen was the 9th most searched celebrity from January to April 2009.

Life and career
Wen's ancestral home is in Gaoshu, Pingtung but was born in Kaohsiung. He graduated from College of Journalism and Communication at Shih Hsin University. In 1999 Wen won Most Photogenic Award at the Men's UNO model contest, subsequently worked as a model and reporter before turning to acting.

Selected filmography

Television series

Film
Melody-Go-Round (2022)
Acting Out of Love (2020)
Begin, Again (2019)
The Dossier of Jincheng (2017)
Fist Sword (2017)
High Heels (2015)
Light Love (2012)
My Dear Stilt (2012)
The Ghost Tales (2012)
The Fierce Wife (2012)
Night Market Hero (2011)
Zoom Hunting (2010)
Tears (2010)
A Place of One's Own (2009)
1895 (2008)

Music video appearances
 "結婚進行曲" (Wedding March) by Andy Lau
 2008 - "如煙" (Like Smoke) from Poetry of the Day After by Mayday
 2010 - "亮晶晶" (Star Bright) from Star Bright by China Dolls
 2013 - "何苦" (Why Bother)

Awards and nominations

In 2016, Wen was nominated for Best Performance by an Actor in the International Emmy Awards for his role in Echoes in Time.

References

External links

 Official Blog
 Official Microblog
 

1978 births
Living people
Taiwanese male television actors
Taiwanese people of Hakka descent
Shih Hsin University alumni
Male actors from Kaohsiung
Taiwanese television presenters
21st-century Taiwanese male actors
Taiwanese male film actors
Taiwanese male models
Taiwanese journalists